Eupithecia albibaltea is a moth in the  family Geometridae. It is found in north-eastern India and Sikkim.

References

Moths described in 1958
albibaltea
Moths of Asia